Hickory Hill is a home rule-class city in Jefferson County, Kentucky, United States. The population was 114 at the 2010 census.

Geography
Hickory Hill is located in northeastern Jefferson County at  (38.289434, -85.567742). It is bordered to the north by Creekside, to the south by E. P. "Tom" Sawyer State Park, and on all other sides by consolidated Louisville/Jefferson County.

Demographics

As of the census of 2000, there were 144 people, 53 households, and 44 families residing in the city. The racial makeup of the city was 79.86% White, 10.42% African American, 7.64% Asian, and 2.08% from two or more races.

There were 53 households, out of which 41.5% had children under the age of 18 living with them, 77.4% were married couples living together, 5.7% had a female householder with no husband present, and 15.1% were non-families. 11.3% of all households were made up of individuals, and 3.8% had someone living alone who was 65 years of age or older. The average household size was 2.72 and the average family size was 2.98.

In the city, the population was spread out, with 25.7% under the age of 18, 4.2% from 18 to 24, 22.9% from 25 to 44, 29.9% from 45 to 64, and 17.4% who were 65 years of age or older. The median age was 43 years. For every 100 females, there were 108.7 males. For every 100 females age 18 and over, there were 98.1 males.

The median income for a household in the city was $65,000, and the median income for a family was $65,417. Males had a median income of $63,750 versus $28,750 for females. The per capita income for the city was $26,226. None of the population and none of the families were below the poverty line.

References

Cities in Kentucky
Cities in Jefferson County, Kentucky
Louisville metropolitan area
Populated places established in 1979
1979 establishments in Kentucky